The Nieuport-Delage NiD 450 was a French racing floatplane, originally intended to compete for the 1929 Schneider Trophy. After the French decided not to participate that year, the type was used as the NiD 650 to speed the development of the proposed entrants to the 1931 event, the NiD 651 and NiD 652. Delays in producing the latters' engines left these unflown.

Design and development
In the summer of 1928 the French government contracted Nieuport-Astra and Société des Avions Bernard to produce racing seaplanes to compete in the 1929 Schneider Trophy. The resulting aircraft were the Bernard H.V.40 and the NiD 450. Design work on the latter was led by Charles Pilon, assisted by Eugène Tracy. Construction of three airframes, two for flight and one for structural tests, began together after wind tunnel and hydrodynamic tests were concluded.

The NiD 450 was a low cantilever wing aircraft. The wing, built around two duralumin spars and with a thin profile, was trapezoidal in plan out to rounded tips, with sweep only on the leading edges.  Much of the wing surface was formed by thin, smooth radiators for the liquid-cooled engine; the rest was wood-covered with spruce leading edges.

Its engine was a  Hispano-Suiza 18R, a W18 engine with three cylinder banks separated by 80°, each individually tightly cowled. The cockpit was well behind the wing trailing edge where the upper engine bank cowling merged, unbroken in line, into the upper fuselage, so the pilot had little forward vision. Structurally the fuselage was a light metal-covered monocoque. The fin had Nieuport's characteristic elliptical profile and the horizontal tail, set low on the fuselage, was a broad oval in plan.

Each was attached to the fuselage centre-line by a pair of wide-chord, faired, steel struts and contained a  fuel, enabling 45 min of flight.

In August 1929, following a dispute with the Trophy organizers, France decided to pull out of the contest but the aircraft development programme continued; delayed by engine problems it was not until February 1930 that flight trials, piloted by Sadi Lecointe, began. On 10 April long runs on the water at Hourtin were made. The exact date of the first flight is not known but had occurred by 1 June when, during a high speed run, a section of cowling came adrift. The aircraft sustained damage which took it back to the factory for several more months.

It was recognised that the  Hispano-Suiza engine was not competitive with the  Rolls-Royce R, so French designs with more powerful but untested engines were planned. These included the Nieuport-Delage NiD 651 and NiD 652, so Nieuport continued to develop the second NiD 450 as the NiD 650.  Modifications to it were based on the lessons of the earlier tests; externally, the principal alteration was a much larger aperture in the nose to assist engine cooling.  A three-bladed  Levasseur propeller was probably used for the first flight on 12 March. Only four more flights had been made by the end of April, with the NiD 650 reluctant to take-off, so new floats  of greater area and with two steps were tried. Strong propeller torque made it hard to keep on line  at take-off so the fin was modified and the floats fuelled asymmetrically. More unsuccessful take-off tests followed; on 22 July the NiD 650, just leaving the water, crashed at high speed. Pilot and engineer survived and the airframe was recovered, but with its wings and floats badly damaged.

A second NiD 650 was built, probably using the airframe of the first NiD 450, incorporating the modifications made to the first NiD 650 and also a new, geared-down Hispano-Suiza 18R which produced . It first flew on 31 August, fitted with a larger fin but was soon abandoned, having missed the deadline for the 1931 Schneider Trophy.

The NiD 651 and NiD 652, respectively powered by a Lorraine 12 Rcr,  
and a Renault 12 Ncr,  liquid-cooled V-12 engines, and with dimensions similar to those of the NiD 450 were the original French hopes for the 1931 Schneider Trophy. Neither engine was ready in time; the NiD 651 was complete but engineless and the NiD 652 airframe unfinished.

Variants
NiD 450 Two built, plus one airframe for structural testing. Hispano-Suiza 18R,  engine.
NiD 650 Two built, first powered as NiD 450 and second, probably built from the second NiD 450 airframe, with geared Hispano-Suiza 18R, .
NiD 651 Airframe completed but without engine. Lorraine 12Rcr Radium, . 
NiD 652 Airframe incomplete. Renault 12Ncr, .

Specifications

References

Low-wing aircraft
Floatplanes
Schneider Trophy
1930s French sport aircraft
 0450
Single-engined tractor aircraft
Aircraft first flown in 1930